Parvomay Neck (‘Parvomayski Provlak’ \p&r-vo-'may-ski 'pro-vlak\) is the 5 km long and 1.55 to 3.5 km wide ice-covered neck between Discovery Bay to the northeast and Shopski Cove and Yankee Harbour to the southwest, linking the northwestern and southeastern parts of Greenwich Island in the South Shetland Islands, Antarctica.

The feature is named after the town of Parvomay in southern Bulgaria.

Location

Bulgarian mapping in 2009.

Map
 L.L. Ivanov. Antarctica: Livingston Island and Greenwich, Robert, Snow and Smith Islands. Scale 1:120000 topographic map.  Troyan: Manfred Wörner Foundation, 2009.  
 Antarctic Digital Database (ADD). Scale 1:250000 topographic map of Antarctica. Scientific Committee on Antarctic Research (SCAR). Since 1993, regularly upgraded and updated.

References
 Bulgarian Antarctic Gazetteer. Antarctic Place-names Commission. (details in Bulgarian, basic data in English)
 SCAR Composite Antarctic Gazetteer.

Landforms of Greenwich Island
Bulgaria and the Antarctic
Isthmuses of Antarctica